Clock was a Swedish hamburger restaurant chain founded by an offshoot from the US-based Carrols. The chain suffered from mismanagement and declared bankruptcy; as the government had acquired the forfeited company, it was incorporated into the state-owned restaurant chain SARA.

As Carrols, Clock used the McDonald's concept with names for hamburgers such as 'Big Clock' ('Big Mac'). Using a huge clock as its logo, the chain grew to be very successful and widespread during the 1970s and 1980s, even branching out to China, but got into economic problems in the 1990s and started closing or selling restaurants. In 1996 Clock actually sold six restaurants (four in Stockholm and two in Gothenburg) to McDonald's. The same year, as part of what turned out to be a new business strategy, the company bought the hotel and restaurant company Provobis, which had the same main owner, Rolf Lundström, who thereby consolidated his holdings. It also attempted to reduce its own ownership in restaurants and increase the number of franchise restaurants, but by 1998 only 14 Clock restaurants remained, of which six were sold the same year and the remaining eight at the beginning of 1999. The company took the name Provobis, and was in 2000 bought by the large Scandic Hotels corporation.

McDonald's continued to expand in Sweden during this period (as did other American chains such as Burger King and Pizza Hut), but in an interview in 1996 the CEO of Clock explained the problems of his company with the increasing competition from other types of fast food such as kebab and sandwiches.

Clock and the Clock logo is as of 2007 a registered trade mark of Swedish company F&S.

See also
 List of defunct fast-food restaurant chains

References
Cecilia Frisk & Peter Claesson, "Hamburgare får ny förpackning: McDonald's tar över del av Clock-kedjan", Göteborgs-Posten 27 Aug. 1996.
Marianne Björklund, "Delar av Clock till McDonald's", Svenska Dagbladet 27 Aug. 1996.
Nils Odén, "Hamburgerkedjan Clock kan avvecklas. Oklar framtid efter köp av hotellkedja. Satsning eller nedläggning kan bli resultat", Svenska Dagbladet 9 Oct. 1996 (article from the news agency Tidningarnas Telegrambyrå).
"Clocks restauranger sålda?" (unsigned), Göteborgs-Posten 26 Feb. 1999.
Kenny Genborg, "Scandic tar över hotellkedjan Provobis", Göteborgs-Posten 13 April 2000.

Restaurants in Sweden
Defunct fast-food chains
Regional restaurant chains